Venecia is a district of the San Carlos canton, in the Alajuela province of Costa Rica.

Toponymy 
Named after Venice in Italy, due to the numerous rivers that give life to it.

History 
Venecia was created on 16 October 1935 by Acuerdo Ejecutivo 110.

Geography 
Venecia has an area of  km² which makes it the tenth district of the canton by area and an elevation of  metres.

It is located in the northern region of the country and borders with 2 districts; Pital to the north, Aguas Zarcas to the west. While at the border with the cantons of Rio Cuarto to the east and Sarchí to the south.

Its head, the town of Venecia, is located 26.8 Km (43 minutes) to the NW of Ciudad Quesada and 80.4 Km (2 hours 17 minutes) to the NW of San José the capital of the nation.

It is located at an elevation of 200 to 2100 meters above sea level.

Demographics 

For the 2011 census, Venecia had a population of  inhabitants.

Transportation

Road transportation 
The district is covered by the following road routes:
 National Route 140

Locations 

Venecia (head of the district)
Marsella	
San Cayetano
Pueblo Viejo
Los Alpes
Buenos Aires
Las Brisas
La Unión

Economy 

Farmers and ranchers use the waters of the surrounding rivers to produce.

Tourist lodging and food services are offered for those who come to visit the hot springs.

Venecia, the head, has health services, educational, restaurants, hotels and supermarkets.

References 

Districts of Alajuela Province
Populated places in Alajuela Province